Deep Bora (born 1 October 1972) is former Indian first-class cricketer. He played  6 first-class matches and 8 List A matches for Assam from 1994/95 to 1997/98. Bora was a right-handed batsman.

References

External links
 

1972 births
Living people
Indian cricketers
Assam cricketers
Cricketers from Guwahati
Cricketers from Assam